Mark Boswell (born July 28, 1977) is a Canadian high jumper, who won a total number of six national titles in the men's high jump event.

Boswell was born in Mandeville, Jamaica and grew up in Brampton, Ontario. Boswell attended the University of Texas at Austin. In 2006, he won gold at the Commonwealth games held in Melbourne, Australia. His other notable achievements in international competition include 7th place at the 2004 Summer Olympics, 6th place at the 2000 Summer Olympics, a silver medal at the 1999 World Championships in Seville, Spain and a bronze at the 2003 World Championships in Saint-Denis, France.

Still a resident of Brampton, Boswell is a father of five and works selling medical supplies. In 2013 he was inducted in the Athletics Canada Hall of Fame.

Competition record

References

External links

1977 births
Living people
Athletes (track and field) at the 1999 Pan American Games
Athletes (track and field) at the 2000 Summer Olympics
Athletes (track and field) at the 2002 Commonwealth Games
Athletes (track and field) at the 2004 Summer Olympics
Athletes (track and field) at the 2006 Commonwealth Games
Black Canadian track and field athletes
Canadian expatriate sportspeople in the United States
Canadian male high jumpers
Commonwealth Games gold medallists for Canada
Jamaican emigrants to Canada
Naturalized citizens of Canada
Olympic track and field athletes of Canada
People from Mandeville, Jamaica
Texas Longhorns men's track and field athletes
Track and field athletes from Ontario
World Athletics Championships medalists
Pan American Games gold medalists for Canada
Commonwealth Games medallists in athletics
Pan American Games medalists in athletics (track and field)
Universiade medalists in athletics (track and field)
Universiade silver medalists for Canada
Medalists at the 1999 Summer Universiade
Competitors at the 2001 Goodwill Games
Medalists at the 1999 Pan American Games
Medallists at the 2002 Commonwealth Games
Medallists at the 2006 Commonwealth Games